Thomas Simons may refer to:

 Thomas W. Simons Jr. (born 1938), American diplomat and academic
 Thomas Young Simons (1828–1878), American lawyer and politician
 TommyInnit (born 2004), English YouTuber and Twitch streamer
 Henry Thomas Simons (1887–1956), English professional footballer

See also
Thomas Simmons (disambiguation)